Thais, sometimes known by the common names dog winkles or rock shells, is a genus of medium to large predatory sea snails with an operculum, marine gastropod mollusks in the family Muricidae.

Species
Species within the genus Thais include:
 Thais ambustulata Hedley, 1912
 Thais dayunensis Z.-Y. Chen & Z.-J. You, 2009
 † Thais demissa Finlay, 1930 
 Thais nodosa (Linnaeus, 1758)
 Thais pseudodiadema (Yokoyama, 1928)
 Thais tricolorata Bozzetti, 2010

Synonyms
 Thais aculeata Deshayes & Milne-Edwards, 1844: synonym of Tylothais aculeata (Deshayes, 1844)
 Thais alouina (Röding, 1798): synonym of Mancinella alouina (Röding, 1798)
 Thais aperta Blainville, 1832: synonym of Drupa aperta (Blainville, 1832)
 Thais bimaculata (Jonas, 1845): synonym of Menathais bimaculata (Jonas, 1845)
 Thais bitubercularis (Lamarck, 1822): synonym of Reishia bitubercularis (Lamarck, 1822)
 Thais blanfordi (Melvill, 1893): synonym of Indothais blanfordi (Melvill, 1893)
 Thais bronni (Dunker, 1860): synonym of Reishia bronni (Dunker, 1860)
 Thais callaoensis (Gray, 1828): synonym of Acanthais callaoensis (J. E. Gray, 1828) (superseded combination)
 Thais callifera (Lamarck, 1822): synonym of Thaisella callifera (Lamarck, 1822)
 Thais carinifera: synonym of  Thais lacera (Born, 1778)
 Thais chocolata (Duclos, 1832): synonym of Thaisella chocolata (P.L. Duclos, 1832) 
 Thais clavigera Köster, 1858: synonym of Reishia clavigera (Küster, 1860)
 Thais coronata (Lamarck, 1816): synonym of Thaisella coronata (Lamarck, 1816)
 Thais delessertiana (D'Orbigny, 1841): synonym of Stramonita delessertiana (d'Orbigny, 1841)
 Thais deltoidea (Lamarck, 1822) - deltoid rocksnail: synonym of Vasula deltoidea (Lamarck, 1822)
 Thais dubia (Schepman, 1922): synonym of Indothais dubia (Schepman, 1919)
 Thais echinata (Blainville, 1832): synonym of Mancinella echinata (Blainville, 1832)
 Thais echinulata (Lamarck, 1822): synonym of Mancinella echinulata (Lamarck, 1822)
 Thais emarginata (Deshayes, 1839): synonym of Nucella emarginata (Deshayes, 1839)
 Thais gemmulata: synonym of Thais (Mancinella) alouina (Röding, 1798)
 Thais gradata (Jonas, 1846): synonym of Indothais gradata (Jonas, 1846)
 Thais grandis (Sowerby, 1835): synonym of Neorapana grandis (Sowerby I, 1835)
 Thais grossa Houart, 2001: synonym of Mancinella grossa (Houart, 2001) (basionym)
 Thais haemastoma (Linnaeus, 1758): synonym of Stramonita haemastoma (Linnaeus, 1767)
 Thais herberti Houart, 1998: synonym of Mancinella herberti (Houart, 1998) (basionym)
 Thais hippocastanum (Linnaeus, 1758): synonym of  Thais (Thalessa) virgata (Dillwyn, 1817)
 Thais intermedia (Kiener, 1835): synonym of Menathais intermedia (Kiener, 1835)
 Thais javanica (Philippi, 1848): synonym of Indothais javanica (Philippi, 1848)
 Thais jubilaea Tan & Sigurdsson, 1990: synonym of Reishia jubilaea (K.-S. Tan & Sigurdsson, 1990): synonym of Reishia luteostoma (Holten, 1802)
 Thais keluo Tan & Liu, 2001: synonym of Reishia keluo (K.-S. Tan & L.-L. Liu, 2001)
 Thais kiosquiformis (Duclos, 1832): synonym of Thaisella kiosquiformis (Duclos, 1832)
 Thais lacera (Born, 1778): synonym of Indothais lacera (Born, 1778)
 Thais lamellosa (Gmelin, 1791): synonym of Nucella lamellosa (Gmelin, 1791)
 Thais langi Clench & Turner, 1948: synonym of Thaisella forbesii (Dunker, 1853)
 Thais lapillus Linnaeus, 1758 - the dog whelk: synonym of Nucella lapillus (Linnaeus, 1758)
 Thais lata (Kuroda, 1931): synonym of Mancinella lata (Kuroda, 1931)
 Thais luteostoma Holton, 1803: synonym of Reishia luteostoma (Holten, 1802)
 Thais malayensis Tan & Sigurdsson, 1996: synonym of Indothais malayensis (Tan & Sigurdsson, 1996)
 Thais mancinella Linnaeus: synonym of Mancinella alouina (Röding, 1798)
 Thais mariae Morettes, 1954: synonym of Thaisella mariae (Morretes, 1954) (basionym)
 Thais marmorata (Pease, 1865): synonym of Mancinella marmorata (Pease, 1865)
 Thais melones (Duclos, 1832): synonym of Vasula melones (Duclos, 1832)
 Thais muricata (Broderip, 1832): synonym of Neorapana muricata (Broderip, 1832)
 Thais orbita (Gmelin, 1791) - White rock shell: synonym of Dicathais orbita (Gmelin, 1791)
 Thais pica Blainville: synonym of Thais (Thalessa) tuberosa (Röding, 1798)
 Thais pinangensis Tan & Sigurdsson, 1996: synonym of Indothais pinangensis (K. S. Tan & Sigurdsson, 1996)
 Thais rufotincta Tan & Sigurdsson, 1996: synonym of Indothais rufotincta (K. S. Tan & Sigurdsson, 1996)
 Thais rustica (Lamarck, 1822) Rustic rocksnail: synonym of Stramonita rustica (Lamarck, 1822)
 Thais sacellum (Gmelin, 1791): synonym of Indothais sacellum (Gmelin, 1791)
 Thais savignyi (Deshayes, 1844): synonym of Thalessa savignyi (Deshayes, 1844); synonym of Tylothais savignyi (Deshayes, 1844)
 Thais siro Kuroda, 1931: synonym of Mancinella siro (Kuroda, 1931)
 Thais speciosa (Valenciennes, 1832): synonym of Vasula speciosa (Valenciennes, 1832)
 Thais stellata Röding, 1798: synonym of Stramonita haemastoma (Linnaeus, 1767)
 Thais tissoti (Petit, 1852): synonym of Semiricinula tissoti (Petit de la Saussaye, 1852)
 Thais triangularis (Blainville, 1832): synonym of Acanthais triangularis (Blainville, 1832)
 Thais trinitatensis (Guppy, 1869): synonym of Thaisella trinitatensis (Guppy, 1869) (superseded combination)
 Thais tuberculata (Sowerby, 1835): synonym of Neorapana tuberculata (Sowerby I, 1835)
 Thais tuberosa (Röding, 1798): synonym of Menathais tuberosa (Röding, 1798)
 Thais tumulosa (Reeve, 1846): synonym of Thalessa tumulosa (Reeve, 1846): synonym of Thaisella tumulosa (Reeve, 1846)
 Thais undata Lamarck: synonym of Reishia bitubercularis (Lamarck, 1822)
 Thais virgata (Dillwyn, 1817): synonym of Tylothais virgata (Dillwyn, 1817)
 Thais woodwardi (Roxo, 1924): synonym of † Melongena woodwardi (Roxo, 1924) - from Miocene of the Pebas Formation
 Thais wutingi Tan, 1997: synonym of Indothais wutingi (Tan, 1997) (original combination)

References

 Vaught, K.C. (1989). A classification of the living Mollusca. American Malacologists: Melbourne, FL (USA). . XII, 195 pp
 Gofas, S.; Le Renard, J.; Bouchet, P. (2001). Mollusca, in: Costello, M.J. et al. (Ed.) (2001). European register of marine species: a check-list of the marine species in Europe and a Hedley bibliography of guides to their identification. Collection Patrimoines Naturels, 50: pp. 180–213

Further reading 
 R. Tucker Abbott, Percy A. Morris, Roger Tory Peterson, (1995), A Field Guide to Shells of the Atlantic and Gulf Coasts and the West Indies Houghton Mifflin Co., Boston, New York (Peterson Field Guide Series)
 Macpherson, J.H. & Gabriel, C.J. (1962) Marine Molluscs of Victoria. Melbourne University Press & The National Museum of Victoria

External links 
 Röding, P. F. (1798). Museum Boltenianum sive Catalogus cimeliorum e tribus regnis naturæ quæ olim collegerat Joa. Fried Bolten, M. D. p. d. per XL. annos proto physicus Hamburgensis. Pars secunda continens Conchylia sive Testacea univalvia, bivalvia & multivalvia. Trapp, Hamburg. viii, 199 pp. 
 

 
Rapaninae
Taxa named by Peter Friedrich Röding